Sigfred Thomas Madsen (November 26, 1915 – July 14, 1966) was a Danish boxer who competed in the 1936 Summer Olympics.

He was born and died in Copenhagen.

In 1936 he was eliminated in the second round of the featherweight class after losing his fight to Dezső Frigyes.

External links
profile

1915 births
1966 deaths
Featherweight boxers
Olympic boxers of Denmark
Boxers at the 1936 Summer Olympics
Danish male boxers
Sportspeople from Copenhagen